Stein Castle ( or Burg Stein) may refer to:

Stein Castle, Aargau, Switzerland
Stein Castle (Bavaria), Germany
Stein Castle (Saxony), Germany